The 2013–14 AFC Ajax season saw the club participate in the Eredivisie, the KNVB Cup and the UEFA Champions League. The first training took place on 24 June 2012, and the traditional AFC Ajax Open Day was held on 25 July, followed by a testimonial match on 3 July for retired former Ajax forward Sjaak Swart (also known as "Mr. Ajax") for his 75th birthday.

The 2013–14 season marked the Jupiler League debut of Ajax's reserve squad Jong Ajax. Previously playing in the Beloften Eredivisie (a separate league for reserve teams, not included in the Dutch professional or amateur league structure), players were allowed to move around freely between the reserve team and the first team during the course of the season. This will no longer be the case as Jong Ajax will register and field a separate squad from that of Ajax first team whose home matches will be played at Sportpark De Toekomst while playing in the Eerste Divisie, except for the occasional match in the Amsterdam Arena. The only period in which players will be able to move between squads will be during the transfer windows. Furthermore, the team is not eligible for promotion to the Eredivisie. Jong Ajax are joined in the Eerste Divisie by Jong Twente and Jong PSV, reserve teams who have also moved from the Beloften Eredivisie to the Eerste Divisie.

Pre-season
The first training for the 2013–14 season was held on 24 June 2013. In preparation for the new season Ajax organized a training stage in De Lutte, Netherlands. The squad from manager Frank de Boer stayed there from 15 to 24 June. During this training stage, friendly matches were played against SDC Putten. The club then traveled to Stubaital, Austria, for additional training. The squad stayed there from 1 to 9 July. A further friendly match was played against Dynamo Dresden in Germany. Returning to the Netherlands, further friendly matches were scheduled against RKC Waalwijk and De Graafschap on the same day, as well as Osasuna and Werder Bremen on the same day, a few days later.

Player statistics 
Appearances for competitive matches only

|-
|colspan="14"|Players sold or loaned out after the start of the season:

|}
Updated 11 January 2014

2013–14 selection by nationality

Team statistics

Eredivisie standings 2013–14

Points by match day

Total points by match day

Standing by match day

Goals by match day

Statistics for the 2013–14 season
This is an overview of all the statistics for played matches in the 2012–13 season.

2013–14 Team records

Top scorers

Placements

 Lasse Schöne is voted Player of the year by the supporters of AFC Ajax.
 Davy Klaassen is voted Talent of the year by the supporters of AFC Ajax.
 Frank de Boer is winner of the Rinus Michels Award 2014 in the category: Best Trainer/Coach in Professional Football.
 Niklas Moisander is voted Finnish Footballer of the Year: 2013 by the Football Association of Finland.
 Davy Klaassen is voted Hilversum Sportsman of the Year: 2013 by the Municipality of Hilversum.
 Davy Klaassen is voted Dutch Football Talent of the Year: 2014 by De Telegraaf and Voetbal International.
 Jasper Cillessen is winner of the Gillette Player of the year 2014 by Voetbal International.
 AFC Ajax wins Football Shirt of the Year: 2013–14 away shirt by Adidas.
 Daley Blind wins the Golden boots award.

Competitions
All times are in CEST

Johan Cruyff Shield

Eredivisie

League table

Matches

KNVB Cup

 The final match between PEC Zwolle and Ajax was interrupted for 30 minutes as a consequence of the Vuurwerkincident.

UEFA Champions League

Group stage

UEFA Europa League

Knockout phase

Round of 32

Antalya Cup

Friendlies

Transfers for 2013–14

Summer transfer window
For a list of all Dutch football transfers in the summer window (1 July 2013 to 31 August 2013) please see List of Dutch football transfers summer 2013.

Arrivals 
 The following players moved to AFC Ajax.

Departures 
 The following players moved from AFC Ajax.

Winter transfer window 
For a list of all Dutch football transfers in the winter window (1 January 2014 to 1 February 2014) please see List of Dutch football transfers winter 2013–14.

Arrivals 
 The following players moved to AFC Ajax.

Departures 
 The following players moved from AFC Ajax.

References

External links 
Ajax Amsterdam Official Website in Nederlandse
UEFA Website

Ajax
AFC Ajax seasons
Ajax
Dutch football championship-winning seasons